The 2nd Moroccan Division was an infantry division of the French African Army which took part in the First World War in 1918-1919.

History 
The 2nd Moroccan Division was created on 4 August 1918, following the dissolution of the 65th Infantry Division, and was commanded by General Louis Pierre M Antoine Modelon.
 
The division participated in the Second Battle of the Somme and advanced towards the Quennevières and Puisaleine farms. 
On 26 August, it advanced further towards Crécy-au-Mont, crossing the Ailette river and pushing towards the Hindenburg line until 5 September.
It then took part in the End offensive and advanced into Germany after the Armistice, reaching the Rhine on 21 November 1918.  

On 25 March 1919, the Division was disbanded.

Composition

Infantery 
 Régiment d'Infanterie Coloniale du Maroc (RICM)
 2e régiment de tirailleurs marocains (2nd RMTM)
 4th Tunisian Tirailleurs Regiment (transferred from the 1st Moroccan Division)

Other Units 
 255e régiment d'artillerie de campagne (artillery unit from the former 65th ID)
 4e escadron of the 24e régiment de dragons
 6e escadron of the 5e régiment de spahis algériens
 Engineer units from the former 65th ID
 Sanity and support units from the former 65th ID

Sources 
 Jean-Louis Larcade, Zouaves et tirailleurs, les régiments de marche et les régiments mixtes : 1914-1918, Argonautes, 2000
 Anthony Clayton, Histoire de l'Armée française en Afrique 1830-1962, Albin Michel, 1994.
 French Wikipedia.

Infantry divisions of France
Military units and formations established in 1918
Military units and formations disestablished in 1919
French World War I divisions